Anarak-e Barmeyun (also Romanized as Anārak-e Barmeyūn; also known as Anārak) is a village in Ludab Rural District, Ludab District, Boyer-Ahmad County, Kohgiluyeh and Boyer-Ahmad Province, Iran. At the 2006 census, its population was 259, in 50 families.

References 

Populated places in Boyer-Ahmad County